Minifie is a surname. Notable people with the surname include:

 Colby Minifie (born 1992), American actress
 Margaret Minifie (1734–1803), English novelist
 Richard Minifie (1898–1969), Australian fighter pilot
 Stuart Minifie (born 20th century), New Zealand Paralympian